Susan Respinger (born 1982) is a contemporary Western Australian muralist and portrait artist from  Perth, Western Australia.

Respinger says that she strives to make art that "makes other people feel happy", "drawing inspiration from travel and popular culture".

Respinger also teaches occasional visual art classes and gets involved with charity projects.

Exhibitions, awards and publications 
Susan Respinger's exhibitions include the following:
 Paper Crown Magazine: Issue One 2015, five pieces features, 2015
 Crab Fest En Plein Air Art Competition, CASM, Mandurah – 20 March 2015
 A Dot on the Run, Courthouse Gallery, Port Hedland – 20 May 2015
 Ellenbrook Art Award, The Gallery, Ellenbrook – 23 May 2015
 Susan Respinger, The Basement Gallery, Perth – 12 July 2015
 Stirling Art Award, Karrinyup Community Centre, Karrinyup – 12 October 2015
 Unseen Art Exhibition, Perth Town Hall, Perth – 31 October 2015
 Paper Crown Magazine: Issue Two 2016, two pieces features, 2015
 Yen Young Australian Art Award, Gaffa Gallery, Sydney – 2015–2016
 A Dot on the Run, Courthouse Gallery, Port Hedland – 5 February 2016
 Art @ Churchlands, Churchlands Senior High School, Churchlands – 27 May 2016
 CUSP, Rosemount Hotel, Perth – 2 February 2017
 Susan Respinger at the Boulevard, The Boulevard Centre, Floreat – 31 July 2017

References

External links 
 

1982 births
Living people
Australian contemporary artists
21st-century Australian women artists
21st-century Australian artists
Australian women painters
Women muralists